John Wesley Townley (December 31, 1989 – October 2, 2021) was an American professional stock car racing driver. He competed in NASCAR's Xfinity and Truck Series from 2008 to 2016, winning a race in the latter in 2015.

Townley's father Tony is a co-founder of the Zaxby's chain of chicken restaurants.

Racing career

Early career

A Jeff Gordon fan in his youth, Townley began racing in karts in Georgia and the Carolinas. Prior to entering NASCAR, he drove in the American Speed Association. He began racing in the Nationwide Series in 2008 when he drove in three races for RAB Racing and had three DNFs. He also competed in 7 Craftsman Truck Series for Roush Racing with a best finish of 18th at both The Milwaukee Mile and Talladega Superspeedway. He returned to the Nationwide Series with RAB in 2009 and qualified for 26 races. He finished 16 races and finished 23rd in points. Townley's driving style proved controversial, resulting in numerous accidents; he received the nickname "John Wrecks Weekly" from fans.

Townley joined Richard Childress Racing for 2010, but was released before the sixth race of the year at Phoenix International Raceway. It resulted in his replacement for that race by Clint Bowyer, and for the rest of the year by Bowyer and Morgan Shepherd. He rejoined RAB Racing for a few races later in the 2010 season.

2012–2017
Townley returned to RAB Racing for the 2012 NASCAR Camping World Truck Series season, competing for Rookie of the Year honors.

On February 7, 2012 Townley was arrested and charged with DUI following an automobile accident in suburban Oconee County, Georgia. He was subsequently suspended by RAB Racing until an "appropriate" amount of time had passed, and was placed on probation by NASCAR through the end of the year. Townley would return to driving for the team in the Camping World Truck Series at the end of March at Martinsville Speedway, where he finished 23rd. He would finish in the top 20 in the following three races, and would return to the Nationwide Series in RAB's No. 99 Toyota at Dover International Speedway and Daytona International Speedway during the summer.

In August, Townley attempted to make his Sprint Cup Series debut at Pocono Raceway, driving for FAS Lane Racing with sponsorship from Zaxby's. Townley hit the wall on his warm-up lap of practice out of the tunnel turn and was replaced by Jason White. On the same weekend he scored his first career top-10 finish in NASCAR, finishing 8th in the Camping World Truck Series race at Pocono.

After the 2012 season, Townley signed with Red Horse Racing to drive the team's No. 7 Toyota in the Camping World Truck Series for 2013. In addition, Townley drove for Venturini Motorsports in the season-opening race for the ARCA Racing Series at Daytona International Speedway. Starting from the pole, he went on to win the event, running a partial schedule in ARCA and the NASCAR Nationwide Series for the team. Townley finished 11th in Truck points.

For the 2014 season, Townley moved to Wauters Motorsports to drive the No. 5 Toyota in the Camping World Truck Series, as well as running full-time in the ARCA Racing Series for Venturini Motorsports. Mid-season, Townley moved to Athenian Motorsports, which is owned by his father Tony Townley, for the remainder of the Truck Series season as well as a partial Nationwide Series schedule.

At Pocono Raceway in August, Townley was involved in an accident during ARCA qualifying and was forced to sit out the remainder of the weekend as a precaution. In December, it was announced that Townley would return to the Truck Series full-time in the No. 05 for Athenian Motorsports while also running part-time in the Xfinity Series in the No. 25 for Athenian Motorsports.

In 2015, he won his first career truck race at Las Vegas Motor Speedway when Matt Crafton pitted for fuel with 6 laps to go. Townley stayed out on the gamble and won in the process.

During the 2016 Drivin' for Linemen 200 at Gateway Motorsports Park, Townley was involved in an altercation with Spencer Gallagher, after the two crashed on lap 154. Townley was eventually fined $15,000 and placed on probation until the end of the year. He missed the following race at Kentucky Speedway for concussion treatment and was replaced by Parker Kligerman. Townley also missed another race when he skipped the Texas Motor Speedway truck race to treat an injured left ankle, with Cody Coughlin taking over the No. 05 for the event.

In January 2017, it was announced Townley was retiring from motorsports and Athenian Motorsports would subsequently be shutting down operations.

Personal life
A native of Watkinsville, Georgia, Townley was named after English clergyman John Wesley. He graduated from North Oconee High School in 2008 and later attended the University of North Georgia.

He was a recreational mountain biker and snowboarder, and also enjoyed playing the piano, banjo, and guitar. Townley announced his engagement to girlfriend Laura Bird in late 2016.

According to court documents, in 2019, Townley was charged with three misdemeanor counts, including family violence battery, after he reportedly threw his wife to the floor, causing her to have reasonable fear for her life. Townley pled guilty to disorderly conduct and was sentenced to 12 months probation. In February 2021, he filed for divorce, which was granted in September of that year.

Death
On October 2, 2021, Townley, age 31, reportedly attacked his ex-wife Laura Townley and Zachary Anderson with a hatchet at her home in the Five Points area of Athens, Georgia. Anderson shot and killed Townley, and accidentally shot Laura, who sustained serious injuries. The investigation is ongoing and no charges have been filed.

Motorsports career results

NASCAR
(key) (Bold – Pole position awarded by time. Italics – Pole position earned by points standings. * – Most laps led.)

Sprint Cup Series

Xfinity Series

Camping World Truck Series

Busch East Series

 Season still in progress
 Ineligible for series points

ARCA Racing Series
(key) (Bold – Pole position awarded by qualifying time. Italics – Pole position earned by points standings or practice time. * – Most laps led.)

References

External links

 
 

1989 births
2021 deaths
People from Watkinsville, Georgia
Racing drivers from Georgia (U.S. state)
NASCAR drivers
ARCA Menards Series drivers
CARS Tour drivers
University of North Georgia alumni
Deaths by firearm in Georgia (U.S. state)
Richard Childress Racing drivers
RFK Racing drivers